General elections were held in Tanzania on 25 October 2015. Voters elected the president, members of Parliament, and local government councillors. By convention, the election was held on the last Sunday of October and was supervised by the National Electoral Commission (NEC). Political campaigns commenced on 22 August and ceased a day before the polling day.

The incumbent president, Jakaya Kikwete, was ineligible to be elected to a third term because of term limits. Chama Cha Mapinduzi (CCM), the country's dominant ruling party,  selected Works Minister John Magufuli as its presidential nominee instead of the front-runner, former Prime Minister Edward Lowassa. After failing to secure the CCM's nomination, Lowassa defected to the opposition Chadema party despite it once labelling him as "one of the most corrupt figures in Tanzanian society". This year's election was seen as the most competitive and unpredictable in the nation's history.

The government had warned politicians to refrain from engaging in witchcraft, and a deputy minister told parliament that reports linking politicians with the killings of people with albinism could be true as it increases during the election period. A ban on witch doctors was imposed in January 2015, as some of them condone the killings due to superstitious beliefs that the victims' bodies "possess powers that bring luck and prosperity".

On 29 October, CCM's Magufuli was declared the winner of the presidential election ahead of Chadema's Lowassa, who has yet to concede amid a dispute. In the National Assembly election, the CCM maintained its supermajority in parliament, but key figures in the previous cabinet suffered defeats in their constituencies. Chadema securing its largest-yet number of seats.

Background

Tanzania is a unitary, democratic, secular and de jure socialist state. Unlike most of its neighbours, Tanzania–mainland has enjoyed relative political stability since attaining independence in 1961. This is part of the legacy of its first president, Julius Nyerere, who led the one-party state for 24 years until his resignation in 1985. Since then, a two-term presidential limit has been in place. As per the directive of the Bretton Woods Institutions, political and economic reforms were implemented in the 1990s.

All eligible voters were registered using the Biometric Voters' Register (BVR) kits. In June 2015, the National Bureau of Statistics (NBS) estimated that there were 24,252,927 eligible voters based on the adjusted national population census. By 2 August, NEC succeeded in registering 24,001,134 voters, although the final number was 23,254,485. The Tanzanian diaspora were not allowed to vote in this election.

At the Woodrow Wilson International Center for Scholars in Washington, D. C., President Kikwete said that he is looking forward to his retirement and described the presidency as being both "stressful and thankless." When asked as to why some African leaders cling to power, Kikwete replied that every country is different and suggested the interviewer "invite these leaders and talk to them". In May 2015, Kikwete denied reports that his government planned to extend his term beyond his constitutional mandate and assured the nation that he was "leaving in October".

A new constitution was expected to have been adopted before the general election via a referendum that had been postponed. The final draft of the proposed constitution includes the establishment of an independent electoral commission and will allow dissatisfied candidates to challenge the results in the High Court within seven days of the pronouncement. Chief Justice Mohamed Chande Othman has said the judiciary was prepared to handle all cases pertaining to the results of the forthcoming election.

On 29 July 2015, 21 political parties signed the 2015 General Elections Code of Conduct. About 4,000 adherents of the  Watch Tower Church in Kalambo District have been prohibited from voting as it is against their beliefs. The Tanzanian Army refuted allegations made by CHADEMA that it had confiscated the BVR cards of its soldiers and warned political parties "to stop provoking it."

Electoral system
The president was elected in a single round of voting. Article 39(1) of the 1977 Constitution stipulates the following qualifications for a person to be elected as President:

a) he is a citizen by birth in accordance with the citizenship law;
b) he has attained the age of forty years; 
c) he is a member of, and a candidate nominated by, a political party; 

d) he is qualified to be [an] MP or a Member of the House of Representatives; 
e) he has not been convicted by any court for any offence relating to tax evasion.

The National Assembly consisted of 264 members elected in single-member constituencies by first-past-the-post voting, 113 women elected based on the vote share of parties nationwide, up to ten members elected by the president, five members elected by the Zanzibar House of Representatives and the Attorney-General. The Speaker could be elected from amongst members, or from outside parliament. Prior to the elections, twenty-six new constituencies were created by the National Electoral Commission (NEC) and the names of ten constituencies were altered. Four opposition parties with differing ideologies have agreed to form an alliance known as UKAWA and intend to nominate a single candidate in each constituency. The alliance consists of the conservative/centrist Chadema, the liberal Civic United Front (CUF), the social democratic NCCR–Mageuzi and the National League for Democracy (NLD).

Presidential election

Candidates

CCM

The ruling CCM (and its predecessor parties) has dominated the political scene since the nation attained independence in 1961. Following the restoration of multi-party politics in 1992, it has retained its popularity and the voters' confidence, winning all of the past four general elections (held in 1995, 2000, 2005 and 2010). Jakaya Kikwete, its presidential candidate in 2005, won by a landslide, receiving more than 80 percent of the popular vote. In the last election in 2010, Kikwete won his second and final term, albeit by a reduced margin.

More than forty members of the party contested in the primaries. On 10 July, the party's Central Committee scrutinised the then 38 presidential aspirants and selected five candidates for the consideration of its National Executive Committee. The top five were Foreign Minister Bernard Membe, Works Minister John Magufuli, Justice Minister Asha-Rose Migiro, Deputy Minister January Makamba and Ambassador Amina Salum Ali. On 11 July, the National Executive Committee selected the three finalists: John Magufuli, Amina Salum Ali and Asha-Rose Migiro.

On 12 July, Works Minister John Magufuli was declared as the party's candidate; he was considered most likely to win the election. The Economist Intelligence Unit in its political forecast stated that "CCM's candidate is almost certain to become the country's next president."

Opposition
Four opposition parties with differing ideologies agreed to form an alliance known as UKAWA and intended to nominate a single candidate. The alliance consists of the conservative/centrist Chadema party, the liberal Civic United Front (CUF), the social democratic NCCR–Mageuzi and the National League for Democracy (NLD).

Former Prime Minister and CCM front-runner Edward Lowassa defected to Chadema and was selected as the alliance's nominee instead of Wilbroad Slaa, who was Chadema's 2010 candidate. CUF National Chairman Ibrahim Lipumba resigned, stating that the coalition had "reneged on its agreement" on receiving those defecting from CCM.

Parliamentary elections
In the previous parliamentary elections, the nation's dominant ruling party, the Chama Cha Mapinduzi (CCM) attained 186 of the 239 constituencies, thus achieving an outright majority. Tanzania uses a parallel voting method for its legislative elections: most seats are elected by first-past-the-post voting, but the special seats reserved for women are elected by party-list proportional representation. On 9 July 2015, outgoing President Jakaya Kikwete addressed Parliament for the last time before it being dissolved. In the 2010–2015 parliament, the CCM was led by Prime Minister Mizengo Pinda while the opposition bench was led by Freeman Mbowe and consisted of CHADEMA (49), Civic United Front (35), NCCR–Mageuzi (5), Tanzania Labour Party (1) and United Democratic Party (1).

More than 2,700 CCM members contested in the party's primaries in order to seek the party's nomination. On 13 August 2015, CCM announced its candidates following its primaries.

Zanzibar elections

The semi-autonomous archipelago of Zanzibar elects its own President and members to its subnational legislature, the Zanzibar House of Representatives. The Zanzibar Electoral Commission (ZEC) has declared 25 October as the election date. The number of constituencies has been increased from 50 to 54.

Presidential election

Opinion polls
Pre-nomination

Post-nomination

Results

President

National Assembly

Reactions
Second-placed candidate Edward Lowassa called for a recount, citing irregularities. In response to the National Electoral Commission's (NEC) plan to reveal the winner of the presidential race on 29 October, Lowassa called for the cancellation of the announcement. "We demand that NEC should do a verification of the results and recount the votes." However, the NEC and CCM  dismissed allegations of rigging, with NEC Chairman Damian Labuva, stating "Claims of vote rigging highly misleading it is not true at all."

Allegations of misconduct
In Zanzibar, the local election commission stated that there had been "gross violations," and that the election had been annulled. A member of Civic United Front (CUF) said that annulling the result was a ploy to re-run the election it has won. CCM also alleged there were violations in at least four parliamentary constituencies it had lost and that it would go to court to contest the result, but added that the "elections were free and fair" and that voting reflected the will of the people. In ensuing protests in Zanzibar, several people were arrested. The annulled Zanzibar poll did not affect this overall outcome.

References

External links

Manifestoes in Swahili: CCM ,  Chadema and ACT–Wazalendo 

Presidential elections in Tanzania
general
Tanzania